Acta Mechanica et Automatica is an English-language peer-reviewed open access scientific journal that publishes high-quality theoretical and experimental articles on all aspects of mechanics, automation and robotics. The journal was founded in 2007 at the Faculty of Mechanical Engineering of Bialystok University of Technology. The Scopus CiteScore, which measures average citations received per article published in the serial, is 0.5 (2016).

Publication process 
The publication frequency is 4 issues per year. Each issue includes about 12 articles. Before acceptance for publication, a submitted manuscript undergoes a plagiarism check and a double-blind peer review by two reviewers. The average time from submission to publication is 30 weeks. The manuscript rejection rate is 10–20%.

Editorial and scientific board 
The founder and editor-in-chief in 2007–2021 was Andrzej Seweryn. The editor-in-chief is Krzysztof Jan Kurzydłowski. The scientific board consists of more than 40 famous scientists from Belarus, Canada, Estonia, France, Hungary, Italy, Japan, Lithuania, Poland, Portugal, Slovakia, Spain, Turkey, Ukraine, United States, including Giancarlo Genta and Mark Kachanov.

Abstracting and indexing 
The journal is abstracted and indexed in a number of scientific databases including:

References 

English-language journals
Multidisciplinary scientific journals
Open access journals
Publications established in 2007
Quarterly journals